Still Time may refer to:
 Still Time (book), a 1994 photography book by Sally Mann
 Still Time (band), an American rock band from San Luis Obispo, California
 Still Time (album), a 2021 album by Karen Matheson